Ospika Airport  is located adjacent to Ospika, on Williston Lake, in British Columbia, Canada.

Airlines and destinations

References

Registered aerodromes in British Columbia
Peace River Regional District